not to be confused with the Jackson Correctional Institution, Black River Falls, Wisconsin

The Jackson Correctional Institution is a state prison for men located in Malone, Jackson County, Florida, owned and operated by the Florida Department of Corrections.  This facility has a mix of security levels, including minimum, medium, and close, and houses adult male offenders.  Jackson first opened in 1991 and has a maximum capacity of 1346 prisoners.

References

Prisons in Florida
Buildings and structures in Jackson County, Florida
1991 establishments in Florida